The Pappinbarra River, a perennial stream of the Hastings River catchment, is located in the Mid North Coast region of New South Wales, Australia.

Course and features
The Pappinbarra River rises below Mount Boss on the slopes of the Gibraltar Range within the Werrikimbe National Park, northwest of Pappinbarra Junction, New South Wales, and flows generally southeast before reaching its confluence with the Hastings River, near Beechwood. The river descends  over its  course.

See also

 List of rivers of Australia

References

External links
 

Rivers of New South Wales
Mid North Coast
Port Macquarie-Hastings Council